John Sandys may refer to:

 John Sandys (classicist) (1844–1922), English classical scholar
 John Sandys (MP) for Hampshire (UK Parliament constituency)
 John Sandys (priest) (died 1586), English Roman Catholic priest

See also
 John Sands (disambiguation)
 George Sandys (politician) (George John Sandys, 1875–1937), British diplomat and politician